Supriya Maskey (born June 17, 2000, in Nepal) is a Nepalese beauty queen. She was crowned as Little Miss World Nepal 2012 held at Tribhuvan Army Officers’ Club in Kathmandu September 30, 2012, on Sunday. She represented her country at Little Miss World and was crowned as Little Miss Teen World 2012 held on 6 October 2012 in Antalya, Turkey.

Teen Miss World 2012

Maskey was placed as the Teen Miss World 2012 pageant held in Antalya, Turkey. Supriya Maskey clinched the prestigious title in the 12th edition of Miss Teen World beauty contest held from 30 September to 6 October 2012.
Beating 27 participants, she became the second Nepali to win the title. Last year in the same contest, Biphaswi Poudel won the title of Little Miss World 2011. The 12th edition of Little Miss World beauty contest was held in Antalya, Turkey on October 10, 2012. The title, Little Miss World 2012 was awarded to Sofia Kutsenko from Ukraine.

References

2000 births
Nepalese beauty pageant winners
Nepalese female models
Living people